For Heaven's Sake is a 1926 American silent comedy film directed by Sam Taylor and starring Harold Lloyd. It was one of Lloyd's most successful films and the 12th-highest-grossing film of the silent era, earning $2,600,000.

Plot 
Millionaire J. Harold Manners finds himself in the poor part of town. When he accidentally sets fire to a charity pushcart dispensing free coffee owned by do-gooder Brother Paul, he pulls out his checkbook to cover the damage. Brother Paul assumes that Manners wants to pay for a mission and asks him for $1,000.

After Manners reads in the newspaper that he is sponsoring a mission, he goes there to dissociate himself from it. He is aghast to find it named the J. Harold Manners Mission. When tears down the sign, he is scolded by Brother Paul's pretty daughter Hope, who does not know who he is, but he is smitten with her. When Brother Paul returns and invites him inside to tour the place, he readily accepts. Once she learns his identity, Hope apologizes.

In order to build up attendance, Manners runs through town provoking people and a crowd chases him into the mission. Some of the men are in possession of the proceeds of a jewel robbery. Before they can beat Manners, the police arrive. The quick-witted Manners takes up a "collection"; the crooks deposit their loot in his hat while the police search everyone. This act earns him the friendship of the gang.

Manners and the girl plan to be married at the mission. His highbrow friends decide to kidnap him, believing that they are saving him from a terrible mistake. As they drive away, one of them tells the wedding's "reception committee" that Manners is not going to marry Hope, and the disappointed committeemen get drunk. Their leader goes to Manner's club to confirm the news, and they free Manners and head back to the mission. Manners must tend to the five drunks, but finally brings them all there and marries Hope.

Cast

 Harold Lloyd as The Uptown Boy
 Jobyna Ralston as The Downtown Girl
 Oscar Smith as James - Manners' Chauffeur (uncredited)
 Noah Young as The Roughneck
 Jim Mason as The Gangster (credited as James Mason)
 Paul Weigel as The Optimist

Further:
 Hal Craig as Motorcycle Cop (uncredited)
 Richard Daniels as Bum (uncredited)
 Robert Dudley as Harold's Secretary (uncredited)
 Francis Gaspart as Man (uncredited)
 Jack Herrick as Mug in Straw Hat (uncredited)
 Jackie Levine as Little Boy (uncredited)
 Andy MacLennan as Gangster in Mission at Collection (uncredited)
 Earl Mohan as Bum (uncredited)
 Steve Murphy as Tough Guy in Pool Hall (uncredited)
 Blanche Payson as Lady on the Street (uncredited)
 Constantine Romanoff as Mug (uncredited)
 Dick Rush as Cop (uncredited)
 Charles Sullivan as Boxer in Pool Hall (uncredited)
 Leo Willis as Mug Who Gets Kicked (uncredited)

Production 
In the late 1920s, Lloyd alternated between making what he called "gag pictures" (such as For Heaven's Sake) and "character pictures." This was the first Lloyd film distributed by Paramount Pictures, and it was a difficult production for him and for his film company. Numerous scenes were filmed and later cut from the released version. Some of the cut elements, especially an underworld theme, were incorporated into Lloyd's 1928 film Speedy. Lloyd was disappointed in the final product and considered shelving the picture. However, it grossed over two million dollars upon release.

References

External links 

 The Harold Lloyd Trust
 
 
 
 Lobby card and stills at silenthollywood.com

1926 films
1926 romantic comedy films
American romantic comedy films
American silent feature films
American black-and-white films
Paramount Pictures films
1920s American films
Silent romantic comedy films
Silent American comedy films